Gryżyna may refer to:
Gryżyna, Greater Poland Voivodeship (west-central Poland)
Gryżyna, Lubusz Voivodeship (west Poland)
Gryżyna Landscape Park, a protected area in Lubusz Voivodeship
Gryżyna, Warmian-Masurian Voivodeship (north Poland)